Weasels Ripped My Flesh is the seventh studio album by the American rock group the Mothers of Invention, and the tenth overall by Frank Zappa, released in 1970. It is the second album released after the Mothers disbanded in 1969, preceded by Burnt Weeny Sandwich. In contrast to its predecessor, which almost entirely focused on studio recordings of arranged compositions, Weasels Ripped My Flesh consists of a combination of live and studio recordings and features more improvisation.

Album information 
Whereas all but one of the pieces on Burnt Weeny Sandwich have a more planned feel captured by quality studio equipment, five tracks from Weasels Ripped My Flesh capture the Mothers on stage, where they employ frenetic and chaotic improvisation characteristic of avant-garde jazz and free jazz. This is particularly evident on "The Eric Dolphy Memorial Barbecue," a tribute to the multi-instrumentalist, who died in 1964 and is cited as a musical influence in the liner notes to the band's Freak Out! album. The song opens with a complex melody over a  rhythm, breaking into howls and laughter at the three-minute mark, then the theme is repeated and elaborated; after a brief rave-up section, the number concludes in stop-start fashion.

Zappa's classical influences are reflected in characteristically satirical fashion on "Prelude to the Afternoon of a Sexually Aroused Gas Mask", a play on Claude Debussy's "Prélude à l'après-midi d'un faune (Prelude to the Afternoon of a Faun)". "Oh No" is a vocal version of a theme that originally appeared on Zappa's Lumpy Gravy album, as well as a pointed barb aimed at the Beatles' "All You Need Is Love". "The Orange County Lumber Truck" incorporates the "Riddler's Theme" from the Batman TV show. The album's closer and title track consists of every player on stage producing as much noise and feedback as they can for two minutes. An audience member is heard yelling for more at its conclusion. The All-Music Guide concludes that the track is "perfectly logical in the album's context."

In contrast to the experimental jazz material, the album also contains a straightforward interpretation of Little Richard's R&B single "Directly From My Heart to You", featuring violin and lead vocal from  Don "Sugarcane" Harris. This song is actually an outtake from the sessions for the Hot Rats album.

The album also documents the brief tenure of Lowell George (guitar and vocals), who went on to found the band Little Feat with Mothers bassist Roy Estrada. On "Didja Get Any Onya?", George affects a German accent to relate a story of being a small boy in Germany and seeing "a lot of people stand around on the corners asking questions, 'Why are you standing on the corner, acting the way you act, looking the way you look, why do you look that way?'"

The Rykodisc CD reissue of the album features different versions of "Didja Get Any Onya?" and "Prelude to the Afternoon of a Sexually Aroused Gas Mask", which featured music edited out of the LP versions. The extended version of "Didja Get Any Onya?" features a live performance of the composition "Charles Ives", a studio recording of which had previously been released as the backing track for "The Blimp" on the Captain Beefheart album Trout Mask Replica, produced by Frank Zappa. The 2012 Universal Music reissue reverts to the original LP versions.

Album cover 

Frank Zappa recruited artist Neon Park to create a subversive image based on a cover story from the September 1956 issue of Man's Life, a men's adventure magazine. The magazine's cover story depicts a shirtless man being attacked by numerous weasels, above the caption "Weasels Ripped My Flesh". After showing Neon a copy of the magazine, Zappa inquired, "This is it. What can you do that's worse than this?" Neon's answer was to craft a parody of an advertisement for Schick brand electric razor based on the "Weasels Ripped My Flesh" theme. The record company released the album despite its reservations about the album cover.

German releases of the album featured an album cover showing a metal baby caught in a rat trap. This cover was not approved by Zappa.

Burnt Weeny Sandwich and Weasels Ripped My Flesh were also reissued together on vinyl as 2 Originals of the Mothers of Invention, with the original covers used as the left and right sides of the inner spread, and the front cover depicting a pistol shooting toothpaste onto a toothbrush.

Reception 
Contemporary reviews of the record called it "far-out" (Billboard, August 29, 1970) and a "random collection of editing room snippets recorded at the Mothers' concerts" (Rolling Stone, October 1, 1970).  Now placed in its historical context, modern reviewers tend to appreciate it more favorably.  A typical example of such appreciation is Christgau's Record Guide (from 1981), which grades the album a B+. In a retrospective review, Allmusic gave it 4.5 stars out of 5, calling it a "fascinating collection", and stating that "Zappa's anything-goes approach and the distance between his extremes are what make Weasels Ripped My Flesh ultimately invigorating" In his book Viva Zappa!, Dominique Chevalier wrote that the album is "one of Zappa's most aggressively bizarre works, full of cross-references to free jazz and modern classical musicians such as Luciano Berio. He also said that the best piece was undoubtedly "Eric Dolphy Memorial Barbecue", calling it "the cleverest tribute that could have been paid to him".

Track listing

Personnel 
Frank Zappa – lead guitar, vocals
Jimmy Carl Black – drums
Ray Collins – vocals
Roy Estrada – bass, vocals
Bunk Gardner – tenor saxophone
Lowell George – rhythm guitar, vocals
Don "Sugarcane" Harris – vocals, electric violin
Don Preston – organ, RMI Electra Piano, electronic effects
Buzz Gardner – trumpet and flugel horn
Motorhead Sherwood – baritone saxophone, snorks
Art Tripp – drums, vibes
Ian Underwood – alto saxophone

Production 
Producer: Frank Zappa
Art Direction: John Williams
Cover art: Neon Park
Photography: John Williams
Digital art: Bob Stone

Charts 
Album – Billboard (United States)

References 

1970 albums
Albums produced by Frank Zappa
Bizarre Records albums
Reprise Records albums
The Mothers of Invention albums
Albums with cover art by Neon Park